Bobby Evans (born December 2, 1967) is a former Canadian football defensive back in the Canadian Football League (CFL). He played for the Winnipeg Blue Bombers and Shreveport Pirates. Evans played college football at Southern Arkansas.

References

1967 births
Living people
Players of American football from Louisiana
American players of Canadian football
American football defensive backs
Canadian football defensive backs
Southern Arkansas Muleriders football players
Winnipeg Blue Bombers players
Shreveport Pirates players
People from Haynesville, Louisiana